Rockville is a city in Stearns County, Minnesota, United States. The population was 2,448 as of the 2010 census. It is part of the St. Cloud Metropolitan Statistical Area.

History
Rockville was platted in 1856, and named for granite rock formations on nearby streams. A post office has been in operation at Rockville since 1857. Levi Gaylord was selected as the first Postmaster. The Government selected Newton Smith on June 6, 1861.  In Rockville the Clark and McCormack Quarry and House, consisting of a quarry established in 1907 and a house built in 1924, is listed on the National Register of Historic Places.

On June 1, 2002, the city of Pleasant Lake and Rockville Township were merged into the city of Rockville.

Geography

Rockville, including the former Rockville Township, is located in Township 123 North of the Arkansas Base Line and Range 29 West of the Fifth Principal Meridian.

Demographics

2010 census
As of the census of 2010, there were 2,448 people, 880 households, and 703 families living in the city. The racial makeup of the city was 91.9% White, 0.3% African American, 0.2% Native American, 0.2% Asian, 0.5% Pacific Islander, 6.1% from other races, and 0.8% from two or more races. Hispanic or Latino of any race were 9.3% of the population.

There were 880 households, of which 37.0% had children under the age of 18 living with them, 68.8% were married couples living together, 6.5% had a female householder with no husband present, 4.7% had a male householder with no wife present, and 20.1% were non-families. 14.4% of all households were made up of individuals, and 4.8% had someone living alone who was 65 years of age or older. The average household size was 2.78 and the average family size was 3.04.

The median age in the city was 40.5 years. 25.8% of residents were under the age of 18; 8.2% were between the ages of 18 and 24; 23.5% were from 25 to 44; 31.1% were from 45 to 64; and 11.4% were 65 years of age or older. The gender makeup of the city was 51.9% male and 48.1% female.

2000 census
As of the census of 2000, there were 749 people, 268 households, and 187 families living in the city. The racial makeup of the city was 94.53% White, 1.34% African American, 0.13% Native American, 3.20% from other races, and 0.80% from two or more races. Hispanic or Latino of any race were 6.54% of the population.

There were 268 households, out of which 44.8% had children under the age of 18 living with them, 58.2% were married couples living together, 7.1% had a female householder with no husband present, and 30.2% were non-families. 23.1% of all households were made up of individuals, and 6.3% had someone living alone who was 65 years of age or older.  The average household size was 2.79 and the average family size was 3.33.

In the city, the population was spread out, with 31.5% under the age of 18, 11.1% from 18 to 24, 37.0% from 25 to 44, 13.9% from 45 to 64, and 6.5% who were 65 years of age or older.  The median age was 29 years. For every 100 females, there were 106.3 males.  For every 100 females age 18 and over, there were 113.8 males.

The median income for a household in the city was $43,854, and the median income for a family was $50,083. Males had a median income of $31,964 versus $22,000 for females. The per capita income for the city was $16,527.  About 2.1% of families and 4.8% of the population were below the poverty line, including 3.0% of those under age 18 and none of those age 65 or over.

Infrastructure

Transportation
Minnesota State Highway 23 serves as a main route in the city, and Interstate 94 passes nearby. Also a branch line of Northern Lines Railway terminates in Rockville and serves the Wenner Gas propane terminal just north of the city boundary. The through rail line to Willmar, Minnesota was abandoned in the 1980s by Burlington Northern Railroad.

Education
Much of Rockville is in the Rocori Public School District. Portions are in the St. Cloud Area School District.

Residents of the St. Cloud school district portion are zoned to Discovery Elementary School. Almost all of the St. Cloud school district sections of Rockville are zoned to South Middle School, and Technical Senior High School. A small slice of land north of Highway 23 is zoned to North Middle School, and Apollo High School.

References

External links
City Website
City-Data.com

Cities in Stearns County, Minnesota
Cities in Minnesota
St. Cloud, Minnesota metropolitan area
Populated places established in 2002
2002 establishments in Minnesota